Class of 1812 is a pinball machine designed by Ray Tanzer and Joe Kaminkow and released in 1991 by Gottlieb. It features a supernatural monster theme and was advertised with the slogan "Frightful fun for all ages!".

Description
Class of 1812 has a dark theme featuring the reunion of a long dead class. The back glass is a vacuum formed 3D image. During Multiball Madness, a large mechanical beating heart and chattering teeth are synchronized along to chickens clucking the 1812 Overture by Pyotr Tchaikovsky.

The top of the playfield contains upper rollovers that advance bonus multiplier. The white target sequence advances the BAT-O-METER.  Completing the left drop-targets lights the ball lock, then it is possible to lock the ball with the right ramp.  Completing the C-O-F-F-I-N letters collects a 2 MILLION point jackpot. The playfield contains elements such as for example pop-bumpers, stationary targets, drop-targets, rollovers, ramps, saucer holes and spinners.

Digital versions
Class of 1812 is available as a licensed table of The Pinball Arcade for several platforms.

See also
Monster Bash (pinball)

References

External links
 

1991 pinball machines
Gottlieb pinball machines